Trying to Be Me is the only album by American country music singer Laura Bryna. It was released on January 22, 2008 via Equity Music Group. "Make a Wish", "Life Is Good" and "Hometown Heroes" were all released as singles.

Critical reception
Country Weekly gave the album two-and-a-half stars out of five, praising Bryna's voice but criticizing the album for containing "some of the most over-the-top tear-jerkers in recent memory." Jacquilynne Schlesier of Country Standard Time similarly said that Bryna had "lots of character in the phrasing", but said "most of the lyrics sound like songs you've heard before." PopMatters also criticized the album for "play[ing] a variety of obvious cards in her pursuit of country or pop audiences."

Track listing

Personnel

 Eddie Bayers – drums
 Laura Bryna – lead vocals
 Lisa Cochran – background vocals
 Perry Coleman – background vocals
 Thom Flora – background vocals
 Larry Franklin – fiddle
 Sonny Garrish – dobro, pedal steel guitar
 Tania Hancheroff – background vocals
 Tony Harrell – keyboards
 Wes Hightower – background vocals
 John Hobbs – Hammond organ, piano

 David Hungate – bass guitar
 Dan Kelly – fiddle
 Jeff King – electric guitar
 Paul Leim – drums, percussion
 Kerry Marx – acoustic guitar
 Brent Mason – electric guitar
 Greg Morrow – drums
 Mike Noble – 12-string acoustic guitar, acoustic guitar
 Billy Panda – acoustic guitar, mandolin
 Kim Parent – background vocals

 Bob Patin – Hammond organ, piano
 Alison Prestwood – bass guitar
 Angela Primm – background vocals
 Michael Rhodes – bass guitar
 Mike Rojas – Hammond organ, piano
 Zach Runquist – cello, mandolin, violin
 Mike Severs – acoustic guitar
 Russell Terrell – background vocals
 Ilya Toshinsky – banjo, acoustic guitar, electric guitar, mandolin
 Andrea Zonn – fiddle

References

2008 debut albums
Equity Music Group albums
Laura Bryna albums
Albums produced by Kyle Lehning
Printworthy redirects